Jerome C. "Jerry" Meyer (July 2, 1927 – July 15, 2005) was a Canadian national champion trainer and Hall of Fame inductee in Thoroughbred racing.

Meyer began his career in racing as a jockey but weight gain soon ended that, and at age 18 he turned to the training end of the business. In 1949 he took out his license and went on to a career that spanned seven decades, both in Canada and the United States.

Based at Woodbine Racetrack in Toronto, Meyer won most every important stakes the track offered at least once, including three of the Canadian Triple Crown races.

Among his early successes in the United States, Meyer won the 1969 inaugural running of the Governor Nicholls Stakes for owner Elmendorf Farm in front of a Labor Day record crowd.

Jerry Meyer died of cancer on July 15, 2005, at Princess Margaret Cancer Centre in Toronto.

References

1927 births
2005 deaths
Deaths from cancer in Ontario
Canadian horse trainers
American horse trainers
Canadian Horse Racing Hall of Fame inductees
Sportspeople from Kitchener, Ontario